is a town located in Tokachi Subprefecture, Hokkaido, Japan.

As of 2008, the town has an estimated population of 5,023 and a density of 6.9 persons per km2. The total area is 729.64 km2.

Climate

Mascots

They lived in the forsts of Urahoro
Uraha is cheerful, mischievous and a little sloppy and gluttonous. His good luck charm is a Japanese rowan branch (which he carries all the time). He can eat delicious food. Due to this he promote food from the town.
Horoma is gentle but solid and caring. She usually volunteers for other activities. Her good luck charm is a Japanese rose (which she wears on her head).

Notable people from Urahoro
Hideo Azuma, manga artist

References

External links

Official Website 

Towns in Hokkaido